Them Who? is a 2015 comedy film written and directed by Francesco Miccichè and Fabio Bonifacci and starring Marco Giallini and Edoardo Leo.

Plot 
Davide ( Edoardo Leo ), is a 36-year-old suburban man with one single goal in life: to earn the esteem of the president of the company for which he works, get a raise, and be promoted to executive. He finally gets his chance when asked to present a revolutionary patent allowing him to land great recognition. Marcello ( Marco Giallini), is a con man, who has two lovely women partners. They deceive their victims into thinking he can make their dreams come true. The meeting between the two unsettles Davide's quiet life.  The two become outlaw odd couple con-men. Hilarious situations with endless bickering. Who is conning who? Can a conned man con another con man or will they both get conned by the other con-man? A fun ride with handsome and innocent Davide falling into the con-man footsteps of rugged & experienced Marcello, or is he?

Cast 

 Edoardo Leo as David
 Marco Giallini as  Marcello
 Catrinel Menghia as  Ellen
 Lisa Bor as Mitra
 Ivano Marescotti as  The President 
 Vincenzo Paci as  Melli
 Antonio Catania as  Redattore
 Maurizio Casagrande as  Maresciallo Gallinari
 Susy Laude as Cinzia
 Patrizia Loreti as David's Aunt
 Uccio De Santis as The Mayor

See also 
 List of Italian films of 2015

References   

N.I.C.E. - New Italian Cinema Events - 26th Annual Film Festival

External links 
 

2015 comedy films
Italian comedy films
2010s Italian films